The 1989–90 network television schedule for the four major English language commercial broadcast networks in the United States. The schedule covers primetime hours from September 1989 through August 1990. The schedule is followed by a list per network of returning series, new series, and series cancelled after the 1988–89 season.

PBS is not included; member stations have local flexibility over most of their schedules and broadcast times for network shows may vary.

New series are highlighted in bold.

This is the first season to feature entirely closed captioning programs on the Big Four networks.

This was the first time that two programs were tied for the no. 1 spot in the Nielsen ratings.

All times are U.S. Eastern and Pacific Time (except for some live sports or events). Subtract one hour for Central, Mountain, Alaska and Hawaii-Aleutian times.

Each of the 30 highest-rated shows is listed with its rank and rating as determined by Nielsen Media Research.

Legend

Sunday

Note: In Living Color premiered Sunday April 15 at 9:30 PM on Fox.

Monday

Note: Fox started their prime time expansion this season starting with Mondays.

Tuesday

Wednesday

Notes: FM premiered Thursday, August 17 on NBC. Seinfeld premiered on July 5. Molloy aired at 9:00 p.m. on Fox from July 25 until August 15, 1990.

Thursday

Note: The Eddie Capra Mysteries, which CBS aired from July 26 to August 30, consisted of reruns of episodes from the 1978-79 NBC series.

Friday

Saturday

By network

ABC

Returning series
20/20
The ABC Sunday Night Movie
ABC Mystery Movie (moved from Monday to Saturday)
Anything but Love
China Beach
Coach
Father Dowling Mysteries (moved from NBC)
Full House
Growing Pains
Head of the Class
Just the Ten of Us
MacGyver
Mission: Impossible
Mr. Belvedere
Monday Night Football
Perfect Strangers
Roseanne
Thirtysomething
Who's the Boss?
The Wonder Years

New series
America's Funniest Home Videos *
Brewster Place *
Capital News *
Chicken Soup
Doogie Howser, M.D.
Elvis *
Equal Justice *
Family Matters
Free Spirit
H.E.L.P. *
Homeroom
Life Goes On
Living Dolls
The Marshall Chronicles *
Monopoly *
New Attitude *
Primetime Live
Sunset Beat *
Super Jeopardy! *
Tim Conway's Funny America *
Twin Peaks *
The Young Riders

Not returning from 1988–89:
Dynasty
A Fine Romance
Great Circuses of the World
Have Faith
HeartBeat
Hooperman
Incredible Sunday
Knightwatch
A Man Called Hawk
Men
Moonlighting
Murphy's Law
Police Story
The Robert Guillaume Show
Studio 5-B

CBS

Returning series
48 Hours
60 Minutes
Beauty and the Beast
CBS Sunday Movie
Dallas
Designing Women
Doctor Doctor
Falcon Crest
Jake and the Fatman
Knots Landing
Murder, She Wrote
Murphy Brown
Newhart
Paradise
Tour of Duty
Wiseguy

New series
Bagdad Cafe *
The Bradys *
City *
The Dave Thomas Comedy Show *
The Famous Teddy Z
Grand Slam *
His & Hers *
Island Son
Major Dad
Max Monroe: Loose Cannon *
Normal Life *
Northern Exposure *
A Peaceable Kingdom
The People Next Door
Prime Time Pets *
Rescue 911
Room for Romance *
Saturday Night with Connie Chung *
Small Talk *
Snoops
Sugar and Spice *
Sydney *
Top Cops *
Top of the Hill
Wish You Were Here *
Wolf

Not returning from 1988–89:
Almost Grown
Annie McGuire
The Cavanaughs
CBS Summer Playhouse
Coming of Age
Dirty Dancing
Dolphin Cove
The Equalizer
First Impressions
Hard Time on Planet Earth
Heartland
High Risk
Jesse Hawkes
Kate & Allie
Live! Dick Clark Presents
Live-In
Raising Miranda
Simon & Simon
The Smothers Brothers Comedy Hour
Tour of Duty
TV 101
The Van Dyke Show
West 57th

Fox

Returning series
21 Jump Street
America's Most Wanted
Beyond Tomorrow
COPS
It's Garry Shandling's Show
Married... with Children
The Reporters
The Tracey Ullman Show

New series
Alien Nation
Booker
Comic Strip Live
Glory Days *
FOX Night at the Movies
In Living Color *
Molloy *
Open House
The Outsiders *
The Simpsons *
Totally Hidden Video *

Not returning from 1988–89:
Duet

NBC

Returning series
13 East
227
ALF
Amen
Cheers
The Cosby Show
Dear John
A Different World
Empty Nest
The Golden Girls
The Hogan Family
Hunter
In the Heat of the Night
L.A. Law
The Magical World of Disney
Matlock
Midnight Caller
My Two Dads +
NBC Sunday Night Movie
NBC Monday Night at the Movies
Night Court
Quantum Leap
Unsolved Mysteries

New series
Ann Jillian *
Baywatch
Brand New Life
Carol & Company *
Down Home *
A Family for Joe *
FM *
Grand *
Hardball
Mancuso, F.B.I.
Nasty Boys *
The Nutt House
Real Life with Jane Pauley *
Seinfeld *
Shannon's Deal *
Singer & Sons *
Sister Kate
True Blue *
Wings *
Working Girl *

Not returning from 1988–89:
Baby Boom
Day by Day
Dream Street
Family Ties
Father Dowling Mysteries (moved to ABC)
Highway to Heaven
The Jim Henson Hour
Knight & Daye
Miami Vice
Nearly Departed
Nightingales
One of the Boys
Something Is Out There
Sonny Spoon
Tattingers/Nick & Hillary
Unsub

Note: The * indicates that the program was introduced in midseason.

+ These shows returned as "backup" programming in midseason

References

United States primetime network television schedules
1989 in American television
1990 in American television